The 2005–06 Ligat Nashim is the eighth season of women's league football under the Israeli Football Association.

The league was won by Maccabi Holon, its second title. By winning, Maccabi Holon qualified to 2006–07 UEFA Women's Cup.

Regular season results

Northern Division

Southern Division

Playoff results

Championship group

Bottom group

External links
Ligat Nashim 2005-06  Eran R, 12 April 2015, israblog.co.il 
2005-2006 Women's League One.co.il 
Ligat Nashim – Top Playoff 2005-2006 IFA 
Ligat Nashim – Bottom Playoff 2005-2006 IFA 

Ligat Nashim seasons
1
women
Israel